Beifeng Subdistrict is a township-level division of the Fengze district situated in Quanzhou, Fujian, China.

See also
List of township-level divisions of Fujian

References

Township-level divisions of Fujian
Subdistricts of the People's Republic of China